Yuliya Borzova (born January 14, 1981) is an Uzbekistani sprint canoer who competed since the mid-2000s. At the 2004 Summer Olympics in Athens, she was eliminated in the semifinals of the K-1 500 m event.  At the 2012 Summer Olympics, she was eliminated in the semi-finals of the K-1 200 m event and the K-1 500 m event.

References

External links
Sports-Reference.com profile

1981 births
Canoeists at the 2004 Summer Olympics
Canoeists at the 2012 Summer Olympics
Living people
Olympic canoeists of Uzbekistan
Uzbekistani female canoeists
Asian Games medalists in canoeing
Canoeists at the 2002 Asian Games
Canoeists at the 2006 Asian Games
Canoeists at the 2010 Asian Games
Canoeists at the 2018 Asian Games
Asian Games gold medalists for Uzbekistan
Asian Games silver medalists for Uzbekistan
Medalists at the 2002 Asian Games
Medalists at the 2006 Asian Games
Medalists at the 2010 Asian Games
Medalists at the 2018 Asian Games
21st-century Uzbekistani women